The Jasper County Courthouse is a 106-ft tall historic courthouse located at  Carthage, Jasper County, Missouri. It was built in 1894–1895. This highly photographed Richardsonian Romanesque edifice designed by architect Max A. Orlopp Jr. was constructed with local Carthage marble and has medieval castle features that include turrets, towers, and arches. It is the second most photographed building in Missouri. It remains in use by Jasper County officials.

The county clerk at the time the courthouse was approved was Annie White Baxter, the first woman to be elected a county clerk in the United States. As a member of county government, she exerted a significant degree of influence in the planning of the building, and she is memorialized on the grounds.

It was listed on the National Register of Historic Places in 1973.

References

County courthouses in Missouri
Courthouses on the National Register of Historic Places in Missouri
Richardsonian Romanesque architecture in Missouri
Government buildings completed in 1895
Buildings and structures in Jasper County, Missouri
National Register of Historic Places in Jasper County, Missouri